This is a list of wars involving Botswana.

List

References

Wars involving Botswana
Botswana
Wars